Aivar Kala (born 16 December 1957) is an Estonian politician. He was a member of VII Riigikogu.

References

Living people
1957 births
Members of the Riigikogu, 1992–1995
Place of birth missing (living people)